The eleventh season of American Dad! consisted of only 3 episodes. The season was broadcast on Fox, with two episodes airing September 14, 2014, and one episode on September 21, 2014. This was the last season to air on Fox; one month later, TBS premiered the twelfth season on October 20, 2014. 

Guest voice actors for the show's 11th season include Jane Krakowski, Paul Reubens, and Kim Kardashian.

With a total of 3 episodes, this is the shortest season of the show to date.


Production
On July 16, 2013, it was announced that American Dad! had been cancelled by Fox. Soon after, cable network TBS would announce that it had picked up the show for a 15-episode 11th season, slated to premiere on October 20, 2014. 

The tenth season was initially to be the final one on Fox; however, on July 20, 2014, it was announced that Fox had three unaired episodes left for broadcast. Reports from Fox seemed to imply that these three episodes constituted a season of their own. Among multiple discrepant reports from TBS, one indicated that the three episodes were the beginning of the 11th season to resume on their network. 

The DVD release and Hulu count this season as the first three episodes of season 12.

Episode list

References

2014 American television seasons
American Dad! (season 11) episodes